Neuwiesenbach is a small river of Bavaria, Germany. It flows into the Kahl in Alzenau.

See also
List of rivers of Bavaria

External links 

Rivers of Bavaria
Rivers of the Spessart
Rivers of Germany